is a tram station in Ino, Agawa District, Kōchi Prefecture, Japan.

Lines
Tosaden Kōtsū
Ino Line

Adjacent stations

,

Railway stations in Kōchi Prefecture
Railway stations in Japan opened in 1907